The President Chester A. Arthur State Historic Site is a state historic site located in Fairfield, Vermont. It honors Chester A. Arthur, the 21st president of the United States, who was born in Vermont in 1829. The site includes a replica of the original early 19th-century home in which he was born that was constructed in 1953 using an old photograph of the house as a guide.  In 1903, a granite monument was dedicated on the spot where it was thought he had been born.

Visitors can also tour the nearby Fairfield Baptist Church, the church where his father served as preacher.

Present day
Today, the home is available for tours on weekends from July through mid-October.

Sources

External links
President Chester A. Arthur State Historic Site - official site
Information about the site

Vermont State Historic Sites
Presidential homes in the United States
Vermont culture
Historic house museums in Vermont
Museums in Franklin County, Vermont
Biographical museums in Vermont
Presidential museums in the United States
Houses in Franklin County, Vermont
Chester A. Arthur
Fairfield, Vermont
1903 establishments in Vermont